Sigma Thêta Pi (STPi), is an international student fraternity based in Quebec, Canada and France, established in 2003.

History
Sigma Thêta Pi was founded by four students at in Grenoble Alpes University, in Grenoble, France, on September 21, 2003. Within five years it established a Beta chapter in Montreal, Quebec Canada at the University of Montreal when one of the four founders exported Sigma Thêta Pi to that school. It is the only French language based general collegiate fraternity.

The Montreal chapter and Quebec chapter of this fraternity are the only Greek letter fraternities to be officially recognized by a French-speaking university in Canada.

Objectives
The fraternity is focused on two main goals. The first is to enjoy the festivities of a student way of life; the second is to put together a social and professional network through the ΣΘΠ's brothers. The fraternity's motto is, Fraternitas, Animi Excelsitas ac Dignitas which means "brotherhood, pride, dignity". The fraternity includes students from different scholastic curricula, different origins and nationalities, which can be associated with its international focus.

Chapters
Chapter list of Sigma Thêta Pi. Active chapters noted in bold, inactive chapters noted by italics.

See also
Fraternities and sororities in Canada
List of social fraternities and sororities

References

External links
 Official website

Fraternities and sororities in Canada
Organizations established in 2003
Fraternities and sororities in France